Temporary Things Taking Up Space is the third EP by the American hard rock band Dead Sara, released on June 8, 2018, under their new label Atlantic Records.

Release
The EP was announced on May 4, 2018, along with the release of two singles, "Unamerican" and "Heaven's Got a Back Door".

Track listing

References 

2018 EPs
Dead Sara albums
Atlantic Records EPs